The Governor of the Belgian province Limburg is the provincial head of government.

Governors
Governors of Limburg (Belgium and the Netherlands):
1815–1828: Charles de Brouckere (1757–1830)
1828–1830: Maximilien de Beeckman (1781–1834) 

Governors of Belgian Limburg (whole Limburg, Maastricht not included):
1830–1831: Frans Karel Anton de Loe (1789–1838)
1831–1834: Jean François Hennequin (1772–1846)
1834–1843: Werner de Lamberts Cortenbach (1775–1849)
1843–1857: Pierre Leonard Louise Marie de Schiervel (1783–1866)
1857–1871: Theodoor de T 'serclaes de Wommersom (1809–1880)
1871–1871: Pierre Jacques François de Decker (1812–1891)
1872–1879: Joseph Bovy (1810–1879) 
1879–1894: Adolphe Goupy de Beauvolers (1825–1894) 
1894–1914: Henri Theodore Jules de Pitteurs-Hiégaerts (1834–1917) 
1914–1918: Vacant – First World War 
1919–1927: Theodore de Renesse (1854–1927)
1928–1950: Hubert Verwilghen (1889–1955) 
1940–1941: Gérard Romsée (1901–1976) (* ad interim)
1941–1944: Jozef Lysens (1896–1950)
1950–1978: Louis Roppe (1914–1982)
1978–1995: Harry Vandermeulen (1928– ) 
1995–2005: Hilde Houben-Bertrand (1940– )
2005–2009: Steve Stevaert (1954–2015)
2009–2020: Herman Reynders
2020– : Jos Lantmeeters

Limburg (Belgium)

Limburg, Belgium Governors
Limburg governors